is a Japanese manga series written and illustrated by Yoshihiko Inui.  The series began publication in Futabasha's seinen magazine Manga Action on 17 June 2014, and the third and final volume was released in June 2015.  Seven Seas Entertainment licensed the manga for publication in North America.

The series is a "dark parody" of "pocket-monster" stories such as Pokémon.

Volume list

References

External links
  at Seven Seas Entertainment

Action anime and manga
Futabasha manga
Horror anime and manga
Parody anime and manga
Seinen manga
Seven Seas Entertainment titles